Marys Hollow is a valley in Crawford County in the U.S. state of Missouri.

Marys Hollow was named after Mary Gillam, an early settler.

References

Valleys of Crawford County, Missouri
Valleys of Missouri